Helsinki Court House is situated on Salmisaari in Helsinki, Finland.

Stylistically the building is a modernist updating of 19th-century warehouses, massive and with slight curves and no detailing except heavily framed strip windows and rounded entrance bays.

References

External links 

 Helsinki District Court

Buildings and structures in Helsinki
Courthouses
Ruoholahti